Aa Raathri is a 1983 Indian Malayalam-language drama film directed by Joshiy and written by Kaloor Dennis, with  Mammootty and Poornima Bhagyaraj in lead roles. Rohini, M. G. Soman and Lalu Alex appear in supporting roles. The film follows the life of a happy family and how a set of unfortunate events ruin their lives. The film's songs were composed by Ilaiyaraaja, with lyrics written by Poovachal Khader.

Plot

Ravi and Indu are happily married and they have a daughter, Minimol. Ravi is working in a bank and Indu is a housewife. Indu was brought up in an orphanage at Ernakulam. Ravi had fallen for her and they got married. They are now settled in Trivandrum.

Abdu is illegally 'employed' as a 'false witness' in court. People will hire him for providing false witness during court judgments.

Venu and his two friends stay in a house. Venu is a decent guy but the other two will always go behind girls for their desires.

There was an invite for Ravi and Indu to attend the feast of Mother (who was the matron of the orphanage in which Indu was brought up), and they plan to go.

During proceeding of one of the cases, Abdu tells that he had seen the alleged person committing a murder, and he should be given the maximum punishment. The alleged person pleads to the court, that he has not committed it. However court orders the alleged to be hanged. The wife and daughter of the alleged commit suicide by jumping in front of the train. After watching their corpses, Abdu regrets to his mother and takes the decision to lead a good life by doing a decent job. He then starts in the job of a fish seller in the market.

On their return journey from Ernakulam after attending the feast, Radha runs and gets into the compartment in which Ravi and Indu are traveling. Radha's stepfather started misbehaving with her after her mother's death so she wishes to escape from him. She boarded the train as her cousin and fiance (Venu) was employed at Trivandrum and she had decided to reach him for help. On reaching Trivandrum, Radha stays with Ravi and Indu. Minimol is much interested in Radha. In the meantime, Ravi starts enquiring about Venu, who was a medical representative. Ravi gets the information that Venu has been to Madras for training, and once he is back he will be promoted to area manager. Days pass and as Radha's grief increases day by day, Ravi gets a job for her in YWCA. However, as per their rules, Radha has to stay there. So Radha parts with them to stay there.

Venu returns after the training, and they start partying in a bar. Ravi, Indu and Minimol visit Radha in YWCA and they go for an outing. After the outing, Minimol wants to stay with Radha. So Ravi and Indu return after leaving Minimol with Radha, with the assurance that Radha will drop her at the house the next morning. Ravi and Indu takes dinner outside and they go for a second show (movie). Venu and his friends too come for the movie and they get seated just behind Ravi and Indu's seat. Venu was seated just behind Indu. Despite initial warnings from Venu, his friends try to trouble Indu. And while Ravi goes to the toilet in between, and as the molestation becomes too much, Indu turns back and beats Venu, thinking that she was disturbed by Venu. As the people in the theatre get angry with the three, they leave the theatre and go to a bar. Venu feels much depressed as he was humiliated in front of the crowd in the theatre for an offence he had not done. His friends console him by telling him that they will take revenge for this. While Ravi and Indu was returning after the movie, they block them, thrash Ravi and take Indu in the car. Abdu sees Ravi, and they both search for the car. However, they did not succeed and they file a complaint with the police. Ravi gets back home and spend the night in chair sleepless. In the morning when Radha returns with Minimol, the phone rings and they get the information that Indu is admitted in the hospital. Ravi goes to see that she was raped, and takes her home. He takes good care of her to recover. Though Indu plans suicide, Ravi consoles her by telling that it's her personality that he had liked and not her body.

As Indu also suggests, Ravi wants to withdraw the case as he fears that the proceedings in the court may hurt Indu mentally again. However, when the police Inspector suggests that it will allow the accused to be free again, Ravi somehow agrees. Abdu was approached for telling false witness in the court for Venu and his friends, but he denies. Abdu assures Ravi that he will provide witness in the court for Indu and Ravi.

On the way Abdu meets his old teacher Rahim. We come to know that Abdu is actually Gopi, who had eloped while he was young, leaving his mother and sister. Gopi was falsely caught for a pick-pocket case and then he had reached the hands of a Muslim family where they had called him Abdu. Rahim says that after the death of Gopi's mother, he had taken Gopi's sister to an orphanage in Ernakulam, and gives the details of the orphanage.

While the case proceedings happen in the court, Radha had a glimpse on Venu and she was shocked to see that Venu is one among the culprits. Abdu tells false witness against Indu, alleging her as a prostitute. Also, Indu could not answer the criminal lawyer's questions. The culprits are set free. Ravi gets angry with Abdu, and start to fight with him, when the crowd pulls them apart. Abdu visits the orphanage to find out that Indu is her sister. He returns to Ravi's house to see that Indu had committed suicide. Radha visits Venu and curses him. While she returns, she is taken into custody by Venu's friends. On seeing that Radha is about to be raped by his friends, Venu fights them. He confirms to Radha that he is innocent and he was the one who had taken Indu to hospital (after his friends had raped her that night).

Ravi was looking to take revenge for all happenings. As he was about to beat Venu, Radha interferes and tells Ravi that Venu is her husband and he is innocent. While Minimol is all alone at the house, Abdu reaches there and takes her. While Ravi sees this he gets angry and starts fighting with Abdu. Abdu somehow blocks Ravi and tells him that Indu was his sister and in order to get cash to conduct her sister's marriage, he had borne false witness in court.

Ravi and Abdu then set out to hunt the two criminals, and finally kills them. The film ends with Minimol being taken by Radha and Venu, as the police vehicle departs with Ravi in it.

Cast
  
Mammootty as Ravi
Poornima Bhagyaraj as Indhu
M. G. Soman as Abdu/Gopi
Rohini as Radha
Ratheesh as Venu
Lalu Alex as Babu 
Cochin Haneefa
Anju as Minikutty
Prathapachandran
Philomina
Jagathy Sreekumar as Sundereshan
Sukumari
Kunchan
K. P. A. C. Sunny
Kothuku Nanappan as Rahim master

Release and reception
The film was released on 23 April 1983. The film was critically acclaimed and became a blockbuster and was one of the highest grossers of the year. The film ran for 50 days in all release theatres.

Soundtrack

References

External links
 

1980 films
1980s Malayalam-language films
Films scored by Ilaiyaraaja
Films directed by Joshiy